Božetići is a village in the municipality of Nova Varoš, western Serbia. According to the 2002 census, the village has a population of 392 people.

See also
Dubnica Monastery

References

External links

Populated places in Zlatibor District